Tokyo Xtreme Racer is an arcade racing video game series created by Genki and inspired by street racing on the Shuto Expressway in Tokyo. Its first installment, Shutokō Battle '94: Drift King, released in 1994 for the Super Famicom. In 2017, Genki released the latest installment of the series, Shutokou Battle Xtreme, for iOS and Android devices.

While the series was most commonly localized under the name Tokyo Xtreme Racer, when published by Crave Entertainment, other publishers have given certain installments entirely different names, such as Tokyo Highway Battle when published by Jaleco & THQ International; Import Tuner Challenge by Ubisoft; and even Street Supremacy when released by Konami.

History

Franchise 
The series was originally subtitled "Drift King", after the trademark nickname of street racing and professional racing driver Keiichi Tsuchiya who is featured in the first Shuto Kousoku Trial episodes and endorsed the game with, then team manager, Masaki Bandoh of Bandoh Racing Project.

Sega Saturn spin-offs 
During the 1990s Genki produced a highway drift/adult content (omitted in the localization Highway 2000) oriented Shutokou Battle spin-off series for the Sega Saturn, Wangan Dead Heat, and a circuit/tune edition unique episode for the PlayStation, Kattobi Tune, which oriented the Shutokou Battle series through a new direction, leading to the Dreamcast version and its worldwide recognition and distribution. "Kattobi Tune" was compiled under the supervision of Rev Speed, a popular Japanese car tuning magazine and features seven licensed professional tuners, RE Amemiya, Spoon, Mine's, Trial, "RS Yamamoto", Garage Saurus and JUN Auto, appearing years later in Racing Battle: C1 Grand Prix and also in the influential Gran Turismo series by Polyphony Digital.

Chronology of Tokyo Xtreme Racer Console Games 

Though the entire Shutokou Battle series has been referred to as the "Tokyo Xtreme Racer" series in the west, only a subset of games had an official "Tokyo Xtreme Racer" title attached.  The games also received different names in different regions, adding to confusion.

Kaidō Battle 
Kaidō Battle (街道バトル) is a spin-off series for the PlayStation 2 created by Genki. They are focused on Touge racing and heavily centered on drifting.  The franchise currently has three games, with two of them being released in North America under the Tokyo Xtreme Racer banner by Crave Entertainment.

The series, like the main Shutokou Battle games, includes licensed cars and authentic Japanese mountain roads as courses. In Conquest Mode, the player competes during the day in drift contests, earning more points for holding a drift longer or for a quick combination of drifts, but earns no points if the player bumps against the wall or a guard rail.  Doing this, the player earns money to buy new cars and modifications. Daytime racing also features racing for sponsors, which includes a kind of racing challenge determined by the sponsor. Beating a sponsor challenge earns the player a sponsor.  Sponsors give the player better parts and extra bonuses for winning drift contests.

At night, the player can challenge rivals in the parking lot, and race them in a vein similar to Shutokou Battle/Tokyo Xtreme Racer:  the first one to have their life bar depleted loses; however, the first racer to cross the finish line will win the race.  Through the night, the player will face the "Tricksters", a type of mini-bosses in the course.  After all the Tricksters have been beaten, the main boss of the course (called the "Slasher") will challenge the player through an in-game BBS system.  After the Slasher has been beaten, the player may advance to the next stage. The final boss in the last course is called the "Emotional King."

The story unfolds in Kaido Battle when Hiroki Koukami challenges and defeat all Slashers, including Motoya Iwasaki, the Speed King from Shutokou Battle, until he challenges Hamagaki, the Kaido President & 1st Emotional King in his yellow Pantera GTS at Irohazaka. By doing so, Koukami becomes the new Emotional King, while Hamagaki becomes a Trickster.

In Kaido Battle 2: Chain Reaction, Tatsu Zoushigaya arrives at the age of just 18. Like Koukami, he beats all Slashers and eventually Koukami himself in his Lancer Evolution 3 at Aso, Hamagaki in his Genki S2000 Turbo, as well as the secret rival Ground Zero Kazioka in his Skyline GT-R. But since he was defeated, Koukami moves away to Hokkaido and the Kaido Circuit spirals into chaos.

To fix it, in Kaido: Tōge no Densetsu, Zoushigaya becomes the Miracles Summit and now drives a black Subaru Impreza Prototype Rally Car and Kyoichi Imaizumi, Zao's Slasher, becomes the Absolute Emperor and drives a white Renault Clio V6 Phase 2. These drivers are now the fastest on the Kaido Circuit. Meanwhile, the 13 Devils from Tokyo led by Iwasaki come to the Kaido Circuit and have the intention to conquer it. In order to protect the circuit from the Devils, they create another team: The Kingdom Twelve. At the beginning, their leader's identity is unknown.

This time, the hero is also unknown and is able to beat everyone, even Imaizumi and Zoushigaya. By beating them, he is able to defeat the members of the Kingdom Twelve & the 13 Devils. By e-mails, the Kingdom Twelve's leader's identity is known after he beats Timberslash: Hamagaki. After beating him and Iwasaki, the hero battles Koukami and beats him. And after these events, the truth is revealed: Hamagaki was still angry since he lost his title as the Emotional King.

Thus, in Kaido Battle 2: Chain Reaction, he challenged every rival and eventually challenged Koukami again at Aso. But Koukami won again, making Hamagaki angrier than ever. Eventually, since Iwasaki became depressed, Hamagaki cajoled him to race into the Kaido Circuit, but by doing so, he manipulated him, and lies to everyone saying that his team protects the Circuit from the Devils, while the Devils didn't know his real goal: to found the fastest Rally Team and Highway Team.

 Games in the Kaidō Battle sub-series
 Kaidō Battle (2003). Released in North America as Tokyo Xtreme Racer: Drift in 2006.
 Kaidō Battle 2: Chain Reaction (2004).  Released in Europe as Kaido Racer in 2005. Not released in North America.
 Kaidō Battle: Legend of the Mountain Pass (2005).  Released in North America as Tokyo Xtreme Racer: Drift 2 in 2007, released in Europe as Kaido Racer 2 in 2006.

Drifting 

The D1 Grand Prix drifting championship inspired the new series Racing Battle: C1 Grand Prix, released in 2005 and remembering the 1997 drift circuit based Shutokou Battle Gaiden and the continuation of the "Shutokou Battle circuit + RPG" concept introduced in Kattobi Tune, a genre close to the Zero4 Champ series by Media Rings.

The first and only episode has the tagline "C1 Grand Prix", which is a double reference to the D1 GP and the Route C1, the latter being the Inner Circular Route of the Shuto Expressway and the circuit for most episodes of the Shutokō Battle series.

List of All Games in Shutokō Battle Series 

1994
05/27: Shutokō Battle '94 Keichii Tsuchiya Drift King (Bullet-Proof Software, Super Famicom)
1995
02/24: Shutokō Battle 2: Drift King Keiichi Tsuchiya & Masaaki Bandoh (Bullet-Proof Software, Super Famicom)
1996
03/22: Tōge Densetsu: Saisoku Battle (Bullet-Proof Software, Super Famicom)
05/03: Shutokō Battle: Drift King Keichii Tsuchiya & Masaaki Bandoh (Bullet-Proof Software/Genki, PlayStation)
 1996/07/16: Tokyo Highway Battle (Jaleco)
 1996/09/30: Tokyo Highway Battle (Jaleco/THQ International)
12/20: Shutokō Battle Gaiden: Super Technic Challenge - Road To Drift King (Media Quest, PlayStation)
1997
02/28: Shutokō Battle '97: Drift King Keichii Tsuchiya & Masaaki Bandoh - New Limited Ver.97 (Imagineer SPD2/Genki, Sega Saturn)
04/25: Shutokō Battle R (Genki, PlayStation)
1998
04/23: Kattobi Tune (Spin-off) (Genki, PlayStation)
1999
06/24: Shutokō Battle (Genki, Dreamcast)
 1999/09/09: Tokyo Xtreme Racer (Crave Entertainment)
 1999/10/14: Tokyo Highway Challenge (Crave Entertainment, Ubi Soft)
2000
06/22: Shutokō Battle 2 (Genki, Dreamcast)
 2000/09/27: Tokyo Xtreme Racer 2 (Crave Entertainment)
 2000/12/14: Tokyo Highway Challenge 2 (Crave Entertainment, Ubi Soft)

2001
03/15: Shutokō Battle 0 (Genki, PlayStation 2)
 2001/06/09: Tokyo Xtreme Racer Zero (Crave Entertainment)
 2001/05/28: Tokyo Xtreme Racer (Crave Entertainment, Ubi Soft). Not to be confused with earlier game titled "Tokyo Xtreme Racer" released in North America on Dreamcast in 1999.
XX/XX: Shutokō Battle H" (Genki Mobile, Feel H" Mobile)
2002
02/XX: Shutokō Battle I (J) (Genki Mobile, i-mode Mobile)
02/XX: Shutokō Battle EZ (Genki Mobile, EZweb Mobile)
XX/XX: Shutokō Battle (Genki Mobile, Vodavone Live! Mobile)
03/28: Wangan Midnight (Genki, PlayStation 2). Officially a different game and series, but in terms of mechanics and assets is a Shutokō Battle / Tokyo Xtreme Racer game.
2003
01/09: Shutokō Battle Online (Genki Racing Project, Windows)
02/27: Kaidō Battle: Nikko, Haruna, Rokko, Hakone (Genki Racing Project, PlayStation 2)
 2006/04/18: Tokyo Xtreme Racer Drift (Crave Entertainment)
07/24: Shutokō Battle 01 (Genki Racing Project, PlayStation 2)
 2003/11/19: Tokyo Xtreme Racer 3 (Crave Entertainment)
08/06: Shutokō Battle Online Special Pack "SpeedMaster" (DigiCube/Genki Racing Project, Windows)
2004
02/26: Kaidō Battle 2: Chain Reaction (Genki Racing Project, PlayStation 2)
 2005/11/16: Kaido Racer (Konami)
2005
XX/XX: Kaidō Battle Cross Action FIRST STAGE (Genki Mobile, ?)
04/04: Shutokō Battle Evolution (Genki Mobile, i-mode Mobile)
04/20: Tokyo Xtreme Racer Advance, developed by "David A. Palmer Productions" in UK and published by Crave Entertainment (Game Boy Advance)
04/21: Shutokō Battle (Genki Racing Project, PSP) CERO+12
 2006/02/28: Street Supremacy (Konami)
 2006/09/29: Street Supremacy (Konami)
05/26: Racing Battle: C1 Grand Prix (Genki Racing Project, PlayStation 2)
07/28: Kaidō Battle: Tōge no Densetsu (Genki Racing Project, PlayStation 2)
 2006/12/01: Kaido Racer 2 (Konami)
 2007/04/17: Tokyo Xtreme Racer: Drift 2 (Crave Entertainment)
09/06: Shutokō Battle Evolution Plus (2) (Genki Mobile, i-mode Mobile)
2006
01/26: Shutokō Battle Evolution (Genki Mobile, EZweb Mobile)
06/05: Kaidō Battle Cross Action SECOND STAGE (Genki Mobile, i-mode Mobile)
07/27: Shutokō Battle Ten (or Shutokou Battle X) (Genki Racing Project, Xbox 360)
 2006/09/27: Import Tuner Challenge (Ubisoft)
 2006/10/06: Import Tuner Challenge (Ubisoft)
2007
03/22:Shutokō Battle Car Sensor Version (Genki Mobile, i-mode Mobile)
07/26:Wangan Midnight (Genki, PlayStation 3)
09/27:Wangan Midnight Portable (Genki, PSP) CERO+12
2008
09/18: Shutokō Battle Neo (Genki Mobile, EZweb Mobile)
2011
XX/XX:Shutokō Battle A (Genki Mobile, Android)
11/01:Shutokō Battle (Genki, Mobage) (shut down as of June 29, 2012)
2017
01/26:Shutokō Battle Xtreme (Genki, Android & iOS Japan only)
Cancelled
2003/11/XX:The Fast and the Furious (Genki, Vivendi Universal Games, PlayStation 2 & Xbox)

See also 
 Shuto Expressway
 Shuto Kōsoku Trial
 Wangan Midnight (2007 video game)
 Initial D
 The Fast and the Furious (2001 film)
 Import scene

Notes

References 

 
Street racing video games
Video game franchises
Video game franchises introduced in 1994